Andra may refer to:

People 

Andra (singer) (born 1986), Romanian singer
Andra (musician), Zimbabwean-American musician
Andra Karpin (born 1979), Estonian footballer
Andra Neiburga (1957–2019), Latvian writer
Andra Day (born 1984), American R&B singer
Andra Samoa, American Samoan chief executive and environmentalist
Andra Veidemann (born 1955), Estonian historian, ethnologist, editor, diplomat, and politician
Andra Whiteside (born 1989), Fijian badminton player

Other 

Andra (novel), a 1971 novel by Louise Lawrence
Andra (television programme), a 1976 ABC-TV Australian children's programme based on the novel
Andra, Russia, an urban-type settlement in Khanty–Mansi Autonomous Okrug, Russia
Andra, Vizianagaram, a village in Andhra Pradesh, India
Agence nationale pour la gestion des déchets radioactifs (Andra), French agency for nuclear waste
Australian National Drag Racing Association, (ANDRA)

See also
 Andhra (disambiguation)

Estonian feminine given names
Latvian feminine given names